Mohammadia is a town and commune in Mascara Province, Algeria. According to the 1998 census it has a population of 71,366.

Mohammadia (formerly Perregaux during the French colonization) is a town in the province of Mascara, it is 80 km southeast of Oran and 35 km north of Mascara.

Under the name Perregaux, the city was founded by French colonists on the ruins of the Roman city of Castra Nova.

History

Pre-colonial period
Very few writings relate the pre-construction of Perregaux. What is certain is that the whole region was a scrubby plain populated with tamarind woods difficult to access because in rainy season, it was likely to retain water. Swamps swarmed in the plain of El Habra. Mosquitoes and dangerous animals made the setting up of an urban gathering technically difficult; according to the means available before the industrial revolution. The tribes who lived in the heights of the plain could graze their herds of oxen and sheep and cultivate on the borders of cereals.

Some historians (Robert Thintoi) assume that the ancient Roman city could be built on the current Mohammadia

Geography

Demography

Economy
Mohammadia is famous with its large fields of oranges fruit, and it is growing with a high quality comparing to the other towns because of its soil.

References

Communes of Mascara Province
Cities in Algeria
Algeria